General Pollock may refer to:

Edwin A. Pollock (1899–1982), U.S. Marine Corps general
Frederick Richard Pollock (1827–1899), British Indian Army major general
Gale Pollock (fl. 1970s–2000s), U.S. Army major general
Sir George Pollock, 1st Baronet (1786–1872), British Indian Army general
Robert Pollok (British Army officer) (1884–1979), British Army major general

See also
Attorney General Pollock (disambiguation)